Tift County High School is a public high school located in Tifton, Georgia, United States. It serves grades 9-12 in the Tift County School District. The school mascot is the Blue Devil. In 2018, the Tift County School District was ranked the 15th safest in Georgia.

TCHS football
TCHS plays in the GHSA class 1-AAAAAAA at Brodie Field. They have won one state championship and have gone to the semi-finals six times. The current head coach is Noel Dean.  Tift County High School shares a region with Colquitt County HS, Lowndes HS and Camden County HS.

Activities and clubs
TCHS's clubs include:

FBLA
FFA
Beta Club
FCCLA
Blue Devil Players
French Club
Y-Club
Spanish Club
Yearbook

DECA
VICA/SkillsUSA
HOSA
Mock Trial
Key Club
Math Club
School Choir
Science Club
Student Council
TSA
ROTC
Literary

Fine arts
Chorus
Band
Drama
Art

School sports
Tift County High School has the following teams:

Baseball
Basketball
Cheerleading
Cross country
Football
Golf
Soccer
Softball
Swimming
Tennis
Track & field
Volleyball
Winter guard
Wrestling

State Titles
Boys' Basketball (3) - 1996(4A), 2014(6A), 2017(7A) 
Football (1) - 1983 (4A) 
Boys' Golf (3) - 1995(4A), 1996(4A), 1997(4A) 
Girls' Golf (1) - 2011(5A) 
Gymnastics (2) - 2011(All), 2012(All) 
Slow Pitch Softball (5) - 1987(4A), 1988(4A), 1989(4A), 1990(4A), 1996(4A)

School band
In December 2011, the Blue Devil Brigade represented the state of Georgia at the 70th Anniversary of the bombing of Pearl Harbor in Honolulu, HI. They even won the Grand Championship at the Pearl Harbor Memorial Parade, and Rickey L. Savage, the band director at the time, was awarded the flag that flew over the U.S.S. Arizona Memorial by the booster organization.

Notable alumni
 
 Rashod Bateman - 1st round NFL Draft pick #27 over all pick, current number one slot WR for Baltimore Ravens
 Nanci Bowen - LPGA major winner
 Larry Dean - former NFL player for the Minnesota Vikings
 Todd Fordham - former NFL player for the Jacksonville Jaguars, Pittsburgh Steelers and Carolina Panthers
 Nick Green - pitcher for the Milwaukee Brewers
 Roy Hart - former NFL and CFL player
 Clay Shiver - All-American football player, member of Florida State University's all-time football team, and player for the Dallas Cowboys of the NFL
 Tyson Summers - Head Football Coach, Georgia Southern University
 Cyndi Thomson - country singer
 Dina Titus - U.S. Congresswoman representing Nevada, former Nevada state senator, and the 2006 Democratic nominee for governor of Nevada
 Rashod Bateman - 1st round NFL Draft pick, current WR for Baltimore Ravens
 Kip Moore - Country Music singer

References

External links
 Tift County High School
  Tift County Touchdown Club

Public high schools in Georgia (U.S. state)
Schools in Tift County, Georgia
Tift County Schools